The Aguano (also Awano, Ahuano, Hilaca, Uguano, Aguanu, Santacrucino, Tibilo) are a people of Peru. In 1959, they consisted of 40 families.  They inhabit the lower Huallaga and upper Samiria Rivers, and the right bank tributary of the Marañon River.

Today they farm and have largely converted to Roman Catholicism.

History
In the 16th century, Aguano first encountered the Spanish. Diseases introduced by the Europeans and warfare with the Jívaro people killed off much of the tribe. Surviving members of the Aguano proper, Cutinana, and Maparina peoples joined together to form what became known as the Aguana people.

In the 19th century, the Aguano lived near Santa Cruz at the lower banks of the Huallaga River. As they became more acculturated into Spanish Peruvian society, they adopted the name Santacrucinos.

Notes

References
Olson, James Stuart. The Indians of Central and South America: an ethnohistorical dictionary. Westport, CT: Greenwood Publishing, 1991. .

Further reading
 Campbell, Lyle. (1997). American Indian languages: The historical linguistics of Native America. New York: Oxford University Press. .
 Kaufman, Terrence. (1994). The native languages of South America. In C. Mosley & R. E. Asher (Eds.), Atlas of the world's languages (pp. 46–76). London: Routledge.

Indigenous peoples of the Amazon
Indigenous peoples in Peru
Ethnic groups in Peru